Edward J. Price (September 2, 1925 – July 21, 1979) was an American football running back for the New York Giants of the National Football League.  He played college football at Tulane University and was drafted in the second round of the 1950 NFL Draft.  Price led the NFL in rushing in 1951.  He died at his home of a heart attack at the age of 53.

Price was inducted into the College Football Hall of Fame in 1982.

1925 births
1979 deaths
American football running backs
College Football Hall of Fame inductees
Eastern Conference Pro Bowl players
New York Giants players
Players of American football from New Orleans
Tulane Green Wave football players